The Aprilia RSV 250 was a race motorcycle manufactured by Aprilia to compete in the Grand Prix motorcycle World Championship until a change of rules ended the engine-class in 2010. From its debut in  it underwent several modifications and upgrades, which culminated in the last version, the RSA 250. Since its inception, the bike won ten World Championships (one as Gilera, using rebranded Aprilia bikes) making it one of the most successful racing bikes of its category.

1991–2007: RSV and RSW
From 1991 to 2007 the bike was used in two different configurations: first the original RSV 250, then the RSW 250, a new version of the RSV used by factory teams and riders. Another version named RSW 250 LE was raced by semi-works teams while privateer riders usually raced the RSV 250 kit production racer.
	
Initially the front braking system was available either with 273mm carbon discs or in 300mm carbon steel, then from 1994 onwards the only version used was the double carbon disc, either with 255mm or 273mm length. The rear braking system was one-disc carbon steel, initially at 184mm, then from 1996 at 190mm.

2007–2009: RSA
In 2007 the bike was made available in a new version, amended to RSA 250, characterized by many different details from previously, including a revised intake system and the new disposition of the gear unit and of thermal groups. The measurements of the frame changed to use a longer swingarm, and obtain benefits both in acceleration and traction. Another change involved use of three accelerometers to get more data for the management of the power of motion in situations of low adhesion in order to speed up the development of Aprilia RSV 4 which entered the Superbike World Championship in 2009.

The new engine was more powerful with a wider operational period, between 6,000 rpm to 13,500 rpm for maximum power.

The RSA (and the "evolution" version of the RSW) were used not only by Aprilia, but also by Gilera and Derbi (rebranded as such), since all three brands belong to the Piaggio group.

See also 
Aprilia RS250
Honda NSR250
Honda RS250R
KTM 250 FRR
Suzuki RGV250
Kawasaki KR250
Gilera GFR 250
Yamaha YZR 250

RSV 250
RSA 250
Grand Prix motorcycles
Motorcycles introduced in 1991